The Bogalusa saw mill killings was a racial attack that killed four labor organizers on November 22, 1919. It was mounted by the white paramilitary group the Self-Preservation and Loyalty League (SPLL) in Thibodaux, Louisiana. They were supported by the owners of Great Southern Lumber Company, a giant logging corporation, that hoped to prevent union organization and the Black and White labor organizations from merging.

Background

Great Southern Lumber Company
The Great Southern Lumber Company was chartered by the Goodyear family in 1902 to harvest and market the virgin longleaf pine (Pinus palustris L.) forests in southeastern Louisiana and southwestern Mississippi.  Bogalusa, Louisiana was developed from the ground up as a company town and was the location for Great Southern Lumber Company's sawmill, which began operation in 1908.  Other company interests included a railroad and paper mill.  The company ceased operation in 1938 when the supply of virgin pines was depleted. Bogalusa became the site of a paper mill and chemical operations, followed by other industry. The Great Southern Lumber Company was the largest sawmill in the world from its opening in 1908, until 1938, when it ceased operation. Even though the company had made incredible profits supporting the war effort its workers still only made 30 cents an hour ($ in ).

Racial violence
On August 31, 1919, Black veteran Lucius McCarty was accused of assaulting a white woman and a mob of some 1,500 people seized McCarty and shot him more than 1000 times. The mob then dragged his corpse behind a car through the black neighborhoods before burning his body in a bonfire.

Union organization
Lum William was able to merge a number of Unions into the Central Trades Assembly. They then asked the sawmill for formal recognition in September 1919. The company fired many of the union organizers and banned company stores, almost all of the stores in Bogalusa, from selling union members goods. The workers went on strike and the company brought in Black strikebreakers from New Orleans. This use of Black, out of town, labours increased racial tension in the town.

Attack
The Bloody Bogalusa Massacre occurred on November 22, 1919, after years of struggle when workers in the timber industry were trying to organize. That year there had been earlier armed conflicts in town and some 200 black workers were forced out. The sawmill at Bogalusa was the largest complex in the world.  To offset labor demands for better wages, the town police arrested black men nightly for minor offences and brought them at gunpoint to be forced labor at the mill. If any were too sick or refused to work, they were beaten. While the International Union of Timber Workers had sections for blacks and whites, four white union men died in this incident while defending Sol Dacus, the head of the black union. It was a highlight of interracial union support. 

Dacus's house was shot up the night before but he and his family escaped injury in the attack.  The next day, he showed up at work, flanked by white workers. The company called out 150 deputies of its large, private militia against unrest. It blew the whistle to signal a riot and attempted to arrest J. P. Bouchillon and Stanley O’Rourke, who were carrying shotguns. While the company claimed the unionists shot first, other eyewitness accounts contradicted them. The white men Bouchillon, O'Rourke, Lem Williams, president of the Central Trades and Labor Council; and carpenter Thomas Gaines were all killed. Two black men were also killed, and the unionization effort suffered. When black workers at the sawmill attempted to organize a labor union, and were gunned down by the largest private army in Louisiana.   

William H. Sullivan had been appointed by the Goodyear brothers to serve as general manager of the Great Southern Lumber Company. Sullivan was also mayor of Bogalusa.   Social order was restored when the Louisiana Governor requested the deployment of federal troops in Bogalusa. Five officers and 100 troops arrived to secure Bogalusa for one month, under the leadership of Major General Henry G. Sharpe.  After this period, interracial union cooperation declined with the rise of AFL craft unions, which had segregated locals. In addition, labor organizing was tainted by government fears about communist and socialist activities after World War I.

Aftermath

This labor action was among several incidents of civil unrest that are now known as the American Red Summer of 1919. Attacks on black communities and white oppression spread to more than three dozen cities and counties. In most cases, white mobs attacked African American neighborhoods. In some cases, black community groups resisted the attacks, especially in Chicago and Washington, D.C. Most deaths occurred in rural areas during events like the Elaine race riot in Arkansas, where an estimated 100 to 240 blacks and 5 whites were killed. Other major events of Red Summer were the Chicago race riot and Washington D.C. Race Riot, which caused 38 and 39 deaths, respectively. Both riots had many more non-fatal injuries and extensive property damage reaching up into the millions of dollars.

See also 

List of worker deaths in United States labor disputes
Washington race riot of 1919
Mass racial violence in the United States
List of incidents of civil unrest in the United States

Bibliography 
Notes

References 

 - Total pages: 1561

 - Total pages: 305
 - Total pages: 332

 - Total pages: 234  
 - Total pages: 386 

Conflicts in 1919
1919 in Louisiana
1919 labor disputes and strikes
History of African-American civil rights
Racially motivated violence against African Americans
African-American history of Louisiana
Protest-related deaths
Massacres in the United States
Labor disputes in the United States
Agriculture and forestry labor disputes in the United States
Labor-related violence in the United States
Vigilantism in the United States
Crimes in Louisiana
Labor disputes in Louisiana
November 1919 events
American Federation of Labor
American sugar industry
1919 murders in the United States
History of racism in Louisiana